Fontaine-Henry is a commune in the Calvados department in the Normandy region in northern France.

The commune is known for its chateau, rebuilt in the 15th and 16th centuries on the foundations of an earlier fortress built by Guillaume de Tilly, sieur de Fontaine-Henry, named in honour of his cousin Henry II of England.
The château is still lived in by the descendants of its early owners, the comte and comtesse de Olliamson.

Population

See also
Communes of the Calvados department

References

Communes of Calvados (department)
Calvados communes articles needing translation from French Wikipedia